List of speakers of the National Assembly of Slovenia.

The Speaker of the National Assembly of Slovenia (literally the President of the National Assembly of the Republic of Slovenia) is the presiding officer of that legislature.

Below is a list of office-holders:

As part of Yugoslavia

Republic of Slovenia 
Source:

References

See also
National Assembly (Slovenia)

 
Slovenia, National Assembly
Speakers